The Alexander Reid mound  is a tumulus (barrow mound) and National Monument located in County Meath, Ireland.

Location
Alexander Reid mound is located on the summit of Carn Hill in the Alexander Reid townland, about 3.5 km (2 miles) east of Navan and the River Boyne.

Description

The tumulus is a circular mound of earth and stones rising sharply near the centre.

References

Archaeological sites in County Meath
National Monuments in County Meath